The Institute of Development Studies (IDS) is a research and learning organisation affiliated with the University of Sussex in Brighton, England, and based on its campus in Falmer, East Sussex. It delivers research and teaching in the area of development studies, and was recognised as the number one international development think-tank in the 2019 and 2020 Global Go To Think Tank Index Report.

History and leadership
IDS was founded in 1966 by economist Dudley Seers who was director from 1967 until 1972. From 1972 to 1981 Sir Richard Jolly was the director of IDS, and later authored "A short history of IDS: a personal reflection". John Toye was director of IDS from 1987 to 1997.

The current director of IDS is Melissa Leach, a social anthropologist and professorial fellow at IDS, who succeeded Lawrence Haddad in 2014. Prior to her appointment she was director of the STEPS Centre. Leach's recent work has explored the politics of science and knowledge in policy processes linked to environment and health; cultural and political dimensions of vaccine delivery; medical research trials, emerging infectious diseases, and ecology-health linkages.

Structure and research
IDS consists of ten research clusters or teams which concentrate their research on specific angles of development:
 The Business, Markets and the State cluster examines how and under what conditions businesses and market systems enable or constrain pathways for positive development. Current research includes a Rising Powers programme focusing on the economic growth of the BRICS.
 The Cities cluster has a focus on the circumstances of poor and vulnerable people within cities and explores ways in which different forms of inequalities interact to produce both good and bad outcomes.
 The Digital and Technology cluster challenges prevailing technocratic views by highlighting inequalities that Information and Communication Technologies (ICTs) may cause.
 The Governance cluster work on addressing the tensions between political liberalisation and globalisation, tensions between the politics of growth and the politics of equity the potential tensions and synergies between development concerns such as the anti-poverty agenda, and the gender-equity agenda and the environmental protection agenda.
The Health and Nutrition cluster researches the political economy of health and nutrition, markets, regulation, diseases connected to malnutrition and how health systems respond to infectious diseases.
The Knowledge, Impact and Policy team work on methodology rather than a defined issue, supporting programmes with monitoring frameworks, knowledge management and research communications.
The Participation, Inclusion and Social Change cluster focuses on designing participatory research methods in international development and the social exclusion facing groups such as women and people with disabilities.
The Power and Popular Politics team investigate political participation and contestation outside of institutions.
The Resource Politics and Environmental Change cluster works on the consequences of climate change on politics, the economy and society are shaped by developmental issues.

Funding
IDS is a registered charity. The top five funders of IDS are:
 the UK Department for International Development
 The Economic and Social Research Council
 The Bill and Melinda Gates Foundation
 The European Union
 The Rockefeller Foundation.

With the University of Sussex, IDS offer a range of scholarship opportunities to help fund MA degree students.

Teaching and post-graduate courses
IDS has engaged in teaching since 1973 when the first MPhil course in development began. Currently it teaches at postgraduate and doctorate level and has been awarded accreditation for its teaching programme by the European Association of Development Research and Training Institutes (EADI).

IDS offers nine master's courses and two PhD degrees:
MA Development Studies
MA Gender and Development
MA Globalisation, Business and Development
MA Governance, Development and Public Policy
MA Participation, Power and Social Change
MA Poverty and Development
MSc Climate Change, Development and Policy
MA Food and Development
MSc Sustainable Development (online)
PhD by research
PhD by published works

Notable alumni

Carlos Alvarado Quesada, 48th President of Costa Rica - MA Development Studies 2009
Shantanu Gupta, Author and Political Analyst, MA Governance, Development and Public Policy 2009
Joanna Kerr,  Chief Executive of Greenpeace Canada - MA Gender and Development 1991
Edwin Irizarry Mora, Puerto Rican pro-independence leader - PhD/DPhil Development Studies 1989
 Salim Mvurya, Kenyan politician - Power Participation and Social Change 2011
 Nancy Okail, Egyptian scholar and activist - Doctor of Philosophy 2009
Naana Otoo-Oyortey (MBE), social activist and women's rights defender - Mphil Development 1993
Melanie Robinson, Her Majesty's Ambassador to the Republic of Zimbabwe - MA Governance and Development 2012
Isatou Touray, Vice President of The Gambia - PhD/DPhil Development Studies 2004
Euclid Tsakalotos, Greek Minister of Finance - Mphil Development 1984
Marta Zabaleta, Argentinian political refugee - PhD/DPhil Development Studies 1979
Robina P. Marks, South African High Commissioner to Sri Lanka - MA Gender and Development 1999

Notable academics

Current academics
Sir Richard Jolly, a development economist who has held various positions within the UNDP and OECD, and was awarded honorary fellowship from The International Institute of Social Studies in 2007.
Robert Chambers, who has contribution to development for his work in participatory rural appraisal, is widely acknowledged.
Ian Scoones was co-director of the STEPS Centre until its closure in 2022, and is well known for his research into land reform in Zimbabwe.
Stephen Devereux is the author of Theories of Famine.
Mick Moore, head of the International Centre for Tax and Development
Carlos Fortin, political scientist, Assistant Secretary-General, United Nations (UNCTAD, Geneva), 1990–2005, currently Emeritus Fellow and Research Associate
Philip Proudfoot, anthropologist based in the Power and Popular Politics Cluster

Past academics
 Bob Baulch – worked for 13 years as a fellow at IDS for 13 years before joining Prosperity Initiatives in 2008.
 Chris Colclough – a fellow (from 1975), and professorial fellow (from 1994)
 Stephany Griffith-Jones – has contributed to research and policy suggestions on how to make the domestic and international financial system more stable so it can better serve the needs of inclusive economic development and the real economy.
 Susan Joekes is noted for her part in the Women in Development approach.
 Naila Kabeer is a professor of gender and development at the Gender Institute, London School of Economics.
 Simon Maxwell worked at IDS for 16 years and is now senior research associate at the Overseas Development Institute.
 Peter Newell is a professor at the University of Sussex, specialising in climate change. He is co-editor of the European Journal of International Relations, associate editor of the journal Global Environmental Politics and sits on the editorial board of Global Environmental Change, the Journal of Environment and Development and the Journal of Peasant Studies.
 Neil McCulloch – Previously a research fellow in IDS Globalisation team. An economist specialising in the analysis of poverty in developing countries and the linkages between poverty and both global and local economic reform. Has led research on the possibilities of the Tobin tax for development.
 Mark Robinson – now the chief professional officer for governance, social development, conflict and humanitarian aid in the UK Department for International Development.
 Hans Singer – known for Prebisch-Singer thesis, Bretton Woods
 Chris Stevens is senior research associate at ODI concentrating on the impacts of Northern policies on the South.
 Robert Wade is professor of political economy at London School of Economics. Economist for the World Bank during the 1980s.
Ronald Dore- Leading Japanologist and Sociologist
Ben Ramalingam, author of Aid on the Edge of Chaos

See also
 The New Bottom Billion
 ELDIS ("Electronic Development and Environment Information System")

References

External links
 

University of Sussex
Research institutes in East Sussex
1966 establishments in England
Charities based in East Sussex